The Kerala Women's League (KWL) is the top division of women's football league in the Indian state of Kerala. The league is organised by the Kerala Football Association (KFA), the official football governing body of the state. For sponsorship ties with Ramco Cements, it is officially called as Ramco Kerala Women's League.

History
The inaugural tournament was held in the 2014–15 season followed by the 2015–16 season. It wasn't held ever since until it was revived for the 2021–22 season.

Clubs

2022–23 season

Champions

See also 
Football in India

References 

Women's football leagues in India
Football in Kerala
Sports leagues established in 2014